The 2014 Santosh Trophy was the 68th edition of the Santosh Trophy, the main state competition in Indian football. The tournament was held in two phases. The final phase was held in Siliguri, West Bengal between 24 February and 9 March 2014. The zone competitions were held between January 26 and February 4, 2014. In the finals, played at Kanchenjunga Stadium, Siliguri, debutant Mizoram beat the Railways 3–0 to clinch the trophy, and the Rs 500,000 prize money, while the runners up Railways received Rs. 300,000.

Qualified teams

Defending champions Services and former champions West Bengal won their respective groups to qualify from East Zone. Railways overcame an unexpected reverse against Assam to clinch their berth in the final round alongside Mizoram from North East Zonal qualifiers. Last year's finalists and 2012 Champion Kerala netted two goals in added time to overhaul Karnataka and qualify behind Tamil Nadu from the South Zone. Maharashtra and Goa were dominant in qualifying from their respective groups in the West Zone. Uttarakhand and Punjab were the last of the teams to seal their final place from North Zone qualifiers. These 10 teams were drawn into two groups for the final stage to be held in Siliguri from 24 February – 9 March 2014.

 Goa
 Kerala
 Maharashtra
 Mizoram
 Punjab
 Railways
 Services
 Tamil Nadu
 Uttarakhand
 West Bengal

Group stage

Group A

Group B

Knockout stage

Semi-finals

Final

References

 
Santosh Trophy seasons
2013–14 domestic association football cups